Decalegrón was a Uruguayan television comedy programme which aired on Saeta TV Channel 10 from 1977 till 2002.

Notable for its refined sense of humour, the programme won several awards.

Cast
 Ricardo Espalter
 Enrique Almada
 Eduardo D'Angelo
 Raimundo Soto
 Julio Frade

References

External links
 Recordando a Decalegrón
 Nostalgia por Decalegrón
 Tributo a Decalegrón
 Propaganda de Decalegrón en 1985
 Apertura de Decalegrón en 1989

Uruguayan comedy television series
Canal 10 (Uruguay) original programming